Ramona d'Viola (born October 30, 1958) is an American cyclist.

She was a member of the 1985 Women's US National Cycling Team and competed in the second Women's Tour de France known as the Tour Feminin. During 1984, 1985, and 1986, the women's Tour de France was held simultaneously with the men's race before being rescheduled, renamed (the Grand Boucle), and largely forgotten by the cycling community.

In 2003, d'Viola captained the first team of women to attempt crossing the Florida Straits from Marina Hemingway, Cuba to Key West by paddleboard (110 miles). The team was pulled from the water mid-crossing due to bad weather, however, a 2004 attempt proved successful. Acting as captain and alternate, the team of international world-class paddlers set a world record in the process. Founder of the Santa Cruz Paddleboard Union which hosts the annual Jay Moriarity Memorial Paddleboard Race, d'Viola is a photojournalist, veteran of the United States Marine Corps, and former crew member aboard the retired America's Cup yacht Stars and Stripes, USA-11.

Photo gallery

References

External links
Cuba Crossing
Valle de Guadalupe
Entrepronomics
Stars&Stripes USA-11

1958 births
Living people
American female cyclists
Cycling journalists
American photojournalists
Paddleboarders
American women photographers
21st-century American women
Women photojournalists